Selce pri Leskovcu is a small settlement west of Leskovec pri Krškem in the Municipality of Krško in eastern Slovenia. The area is part of the traditional region of Lower Carniola. It is now included in the Lower Sava Statistical Region.

Name
The name of the settlement was changed from Selce to Selce pri Leskovcu in 1953.

Cultural heritage
There is a small chapel-shrine in the settlement, dedicated to the Virgin Mary. It was built in the early 20th century.

References

External links
Selce pri Leskovcu on Geopedia

Populated places in the Municipality of Krško